Orophia mendosella is a species of moth in the family Depressariidae. It was described by Zeller in 1868. It is found in Italy, Austria and Slovenia.

References

Moths described in 1868
Orophia
Moths of Europe